Sulcusuchus is a genus of polycotylid plesiosaur from the Late Campanian of Argentina.

Description 
The type species Sulcusuchus erraini was named in 1990 by Zulma Brandoni de Gasparini and Luis Spalletti. It was at first considered to have been a dyrosaurid crocodile, hence its generic name: "trough crocodile". Its holotype, MPEF 650, was at Jacobacci, Río Negro Province, uncovered in a layer of the late Campanian La Colonia Formation. It consists of a posterior left mandible fragment of about half a meter long with an associated jaw joint condyle of the skull, lower braincase, rear palate and middle snout fragment. The outer side of the mandible shows the trough, which would be exceptional for a crocodile. The mandibula and pterygoids show grooves that may have housed electro-sensitive organs. The snout is very elongated and the pterygoids are fused.

See also 

 List of plesiosaur genera
 Timeline of plesiosaur research

References 

Late Cretaceous plesiosaurs
Campanian life
Maastrichtian life
Plesiosaurs of South America
Cretaceous Argentina
Fossils of Argentina
Fossil taxa described in 1990
Taxa named by Zulma Brandoni de Gasparini
Sauropterygian genera